Květoslava Jeriová-Pecková (alternatively also Květa Jeriová-Pecková; born Květoslava Jeriová, 10 October 1956) is a former Czech cross-country skier. She competed from 1980 to 1984. She won three medals at the Winter Olympics with a silver at the 4 × 5 km relay (1984) and two bronzes in the 5 km (1980, 1984). Jeriová was the most successful Czech woman cross-country skier until Kateřina Neumannová came along in the 1990s.

She also won a bronze medal in the 10 km at the 1982 FIS Nordic World Ski Championships and won a total of eight World cup events during her short career.

Jeriová also won the 5 km event at the Holmenkollen ski festival in 1981.

Personal life
She is married to Zdeněk Pecka.

Cross-country skiing results
All results are sourced from the International Ski Federation (FIS).

Olympic Games
 3 medals – (1 silver, 2 bronze)

World Championships
 1 medal – (1 bronze)

World Cup

Individual podiums
8 victories
10 podiums

Team podiums
 1 podium

References

External links
 Chat s osobností 
 
  
 Jeriová's bio on Infocentrum českých sportovců 
 
 

1956 births
Cross-country skiers at the 1980 Winter Olympics
Cross-country skiers at the 1984 Winter Olympics
Czechoslovak skiers
Czech female cross-country skiers
Holmenkollen Ski Festival winners
Living people
Olympic silver medalists for Czechoslovakia
Olympic bronze medalists for Czechoslovakia
Olympic medalists in cross-country skiing
FIS Nordic World Ski Championships medalists in cross-country skiing
Medalists at the 1984 Winter Olympics
Medalists at the 1980 Winter Olympics
Universiade medalists in cross-country skiing
People from Semily District
Universiade silver medalists for Czechoslovakia
Competitors at the 1981 Winter Universiade
Olympic cross-country skiers of Czechoslovakia
Sportspeople from the Liberec Region